Blastobasis vittata is a moth of the family Blastobasidae. It was thought to be endemic to Madeira but is now known to inhabit the Netherlands, France, the Channel Islands, England and Northern Ireland.

Taxonomy
The name Blastobasis lignea was for a time used for records now identified as Blastobasis adustella. Karsholt & Sinev's taxonomic revision in 2004 reclassified Walsingham's original B. lignea specimen as B. vittata, making lignea properly the junior synonym of vittata. B. adustella was originally described by Walsingham as a variety of B. lignea.

References

External links
 Microlepidoptera in Nederland in 2003, with a note on the taxonomic status of lignea, adustella and vittata 

Blastobasis
Moths described in 1858
Moths of Europe
Taxa named by Thomas Vernon Wollaston